Kampos is a former municipality in the Karditsa regional unit, Thessaly, Greece. Since the 2011 local government reform it is part of the municipality Karditsa, of which it is a municipal unit. The municipal unit has an area of 90.400 km2. Population 4,255 (2011). The seat of the municipality was in Stavros.

References

Populated places in Karditsa (regional unit)